El-Habs, nicknamed Valley of the Monks (Bik'at HaNezirim) is a site of a cave which served Christian monastic chambers, on the channel of the Gimzo Stream. It is situated at the foot of Horbat Zekhariya and together with Horbat Kelah form a complex of archaeological sites in the hills of Modi'in-Maccabim-Re'ut, in the territory of Ben Shemen Forest. The site serves today as picnic point, with several hiking and bicycle trails passing by.

Apart from the caves are other features. To the northwest is water reservoir, next to which the remains of a small settlement dating to the Byzantine period (330-636 CE). To the east a sculpted, rock-cut burial cave with five burials, dating to the Roman period (1st century BCE to 1st century CE). Most of the sites are related to Christian activity in the region. The site was explored by 19th century researchers from France and the United Kingdom, and by Israeli archaeologists in the 90s.

Discovery and name 
The site was studied by the French explorers Victor Guérin in 1870 and Charles Simon Clermont-Ganneau in 1871–74, and in 1874 by the British Palestine Exploration Fund as part of the PEF Survey of Palestine. Their discoveries were confirmed in 1892 by Paul M. Séjourné of the École Biblique in Jerusalem. In the 1990s, the site was surveyed as part of the Archaeological Survey of Israel by a team of the Israel Antiquities Authority (IAA), headed by Alon Shavit.

The Arabic name of the site, as it appears in all 19th century sources is el-Habs, which was explained in 1881 by Edward Henry Palmer of the PEF as meaning "The Religious Endowmen" or "Mosque Property" (similar to "waqf"). The Hebrew nickname Valley of the Monks or Monks' Valley was given by the historical geographer Zohar Bar'am, which was popularized by Israeli artist Oded Feingersh(he). The name has been adopted by the Jewish National Fund. The municipality of Modi'in-Maccabim-Reut has published an article on the site, proposing an alternative name: Cave Valley in Gamzo Stream (Bikat Ha'Nezirim BeNahal Gamzo).

El-Habs cave 
The cave hewn into the foot of the hill on which Horbat Zekharya stands and appears in the IAA survey as Site 148 (Ma‘arot Nizirim meaning: "Monks' Caves"). It is a complex of rock-hewn cavities, most likely serving as monastic chambers. In the entrance there is a courtyard, with an area of 40 square meters, under a bedrock ceiling, that is supported by a pillar. At least two branches of cavities are accessed from the courtyard, measuring up to 8 meters in length at between 1.5 to 1.8 in height. Some of the chambers feature rock-cut benches and crosses are incised on the walls.

Bir es-Shami 

The water reservoir or Birkeh is located to the north of the monastic caves and appears in the IAA survey as Site 147 (Bir es-Shami). The reservoir has a rectangular shape, measuring 10 x 15 meters. It has a depth of 3 meters, its base is hewn in bedrock and built stones surviving up to three courses. The reservoir is accessed through a staircase. An of ashlar-built dam collects rainwater and prevents rocks from the valley to erode into the reservoir. To the northeast of the reservoir, the remains of a settlement spanning 5 dunams were reported by the IAA survey, including walls and pottery dated to the Byzantine period (4th-7th centuries CE).

Rock-hewn tomb 
The tomb is located to the east of the caves and pool and appears in the IAA survey as Site 149 (Bir es-Shami (West)). Its entrance is mostly concealed by earth. Clermont-Ganneau dated it in 1896 to the early Roman period based on its architecture. It was dug into the bedrock and its façade was shaped as a pediment, situated on two columns. In the tympanum a bird was carved, most likely an eagle. The inner chamber has five arcosolia (place of burial), one facing the entrance and two on each of the other side, separated by engaged columns. The chamber walls were probably covered with a layer of stucco, pieces of which were found by Clermont-Ganneau. A cornice runs round the chamber. In 2014, Shavit reported that the relief of the eagle was destroyed, probably intentionally.

"Inscribed tomb" 

Clermont-Ganneau included in his report a tomb. The tomb had two loculi (a niche serving for burial), each with two vault, incised with crosses. One of the vaults had a Greek inscription cut into its wall:

Clearmont-Ganneau translated it as "Tomb of George", while Condor and Kithcener of the PEF translated it as "Monument of Georgeos". The crosses indicate it was of Christian origin. The members of the PEF dated the inscription based on its character to the 12th century CE (Crusader era). In 1891, Séjourné visited the site during a tour in the region and reported that the inscription was destroyed.

References

Bibliography 

 

  

Archaeological sites in Israel